Berkshire, Hampshire and Franklin was a district of the Massachusetts Senate from 2003 to 2013. It covered the expanse of Berkshire, Hampshire and Franklin counties.  It was last represented in the State Senate by Benjamin Downing of the Democratic Party. Until the election of Andrea Nuciforo in 1997, the district had been a Republican stronghold.

List of senators

See also
 List of former districts of the Massachusetts Senate

References

berkshire
History of Berkshire County, Massachusetts
History of Hampshire County, Massachusetts
History of Franklin County, Massachusetts